Charles Basil Royson Duffell (born 20 October 1986) is an English cricketer: a right-handed batsman and wicket-keeper who has played first-class cricket.

Early life and education

Duffell was born at Hanover, Germany to Lieutenant-General Sir Peter Duffell and his wife Ann Murray, daughter of Colonel Basil Bethune Neville Woodd, of a landed gentry family of Shynewood, Shropshire. He was educated at Radley College in Oxfordshire, then at Oxford Brookes University.

Cricket career

He was part of the Middlesex County Cricket Club academy, representing the club at 2nd XI level and played for both Oxford University Centre of Cricketing Excellence and MCC Universities. While studying for a degree in Real Estate and Business management at Oxford Brookes University, Duffell made his first-class debut when Middlesex played against Oxford MCCU in 2007.

References

https://cricketarchive.com/Middlesex/Players/89/89137/89137.html

http://www.espncricinfo.com/england/content/player/290407.html

External links
Charlie Duffell at ESPNcricinfo

1986 births
Living people
English cricketers
English cricketers of the 21st century
Oxford MCCU cricketers